Phaea mirabilis is a species of beetle in the family Cerambycidae. It was described by Henry Walter Bates in 1874. It is known from Costa Rica and Mexico.

References

mirabilis
Beetles described in 1874